Bruce Thomson (born 1 October 1955) is a former Australian rules footballer who played with Geelong in the Victorian Football League (VFL).

Notes

External links 
		

Living people
1955 births
Australian rules footballers from Victoria (Australia)
Geelong Football Club players
Newtown & Chilwell Football Club players